Anna Hepp (born 1977 in Marl, North Rhine-Westphalia) is a German filmmaker, artist and photographer.

Life and work
From 1996 to 1998 Anna Hepp studied education and philosophy at the University of Essen. In 1998 she started an apprenticeship as a photographer, which she completed with a certificate in 2001.

Since 2001 Anna Hepp has been working as a freelance and employed photographer. In 2003 she began her studies of audiovisual media at the Academy of Media Arts Cologne, which she finished with distinction in 2009. Her diploma film A Day and an Eternity  (Ein Tag und eine Ewigkeit) received numerous festival awards, among others in China. The short film also received the "valuable" rating from the German Deutsche Film- und Medienbewertung (FBW).

Anna Hepp's second film, the documentary Turkish Kraut (Rotkohl und Blaukraut) celebrated its world premiere at the 61st Berlin International Film Festival in 2011. In 2012, her short film portrait I would prefer not to (Ich möchte lieber nicht) about Hilmar Hoffmann, the former Head of the Frankfurt Department of Culture, was released. In the same year, Anna Hepp also received a scholarship from the Goethe Institute in Porto Alegre, Brazil, as Artist in Residence.

Since 2015 Anna Hepp has been working on the realisation of an artistic film portrait about the famous German film director Edgar Reitz, which was financially supported by the German film foundations Filmförderungsanstalt (FFA), Film- und Medienstiftung NRW and Kuratorium junger deutscher Film. The completed project, the documentary film entitled Eight Hundred Times Lonely (800 Mal Einsam – ein Tag mit dem Filemaker Edgar Reitz), celebrated its world premiere on 6 September 2019 at the 76th Venice International Film Festival and was nominated for the Venezia Classici Award in the category Documentary on Cinema.

Anna Hepp lives in Cologne.

Filmography (selection) 
 2009: A Day and an Eternity (Ein Tag und eine Ewigkeit) (documentary short film), (director, cinematographer, screenwriter, editor and producer)
 2011: Turkish Kraut (Rotkohl und Blaukraut) (documentary film), (director, concept)
 2012: I would prefer not to (Ich möchte lieber nicht) (documentary short film), (director, screenwriter, editor and producer)
 2015: To the old People of Porto Alegre (short documentary), (director, cinematographer and screenwriter)
 2019: Eight Hundred Times Lonely (800 Mal Einsam – ein Tag mit dem Filmemacher Edgar Reitz) (documentary film), (director, screenwriter and producer)

Awards and nominations 
2009: Jury Award at the Beijing Student Film Festival for A Day and an Eternity
2010: Prize Best international documentary film at the Portuguese FIKE – Festival Internacional de Curtas Metragens de Évora for A Day and an Eternity
2010: Audience award in the category German Competition at the International Shortfilm Festival Hamburg for A Day and an Eternity
2010: Jury Award for the best documentary film at the Bavarian Landshuter Kurzfilmfestival for A Day and an Eternity
2011: Nomination for the award for female picture designers at the International Women's Film Festival Dortmund | Cologne for A Day and an Eternity
2011: Nomination for the award for female picture designers at the International Women's Film Festival Dortmund | Cologne for Turkish Kraut
2013: Nomination for the Jury award in the category German Competition at the International Shortfilm Festival Hamburg for I would prefer not to
2019: Nomination for the Venezia Classici Award in the category Best Documentary on Cinema at the 76th Venice International Film Festival for Eight Hundred Times Lonely

References

External links 
 
 Official website (German)

German documentary film directors
German women film directors
Film people from North Rhine-Westphalia
German artists
1977 births
Living people
People from Marl, North Rhine-Westphalia